Note Out is a 2011 Malayalam comedy film directed by debutant Kutty Naduvil starring Nishan and Mithra Kurian in the lead roles. The music of the film has been composed by Vinu Thomas with lyrics penned by Anil Panachooran. The film released on 14 January 2011. The film is produced by Joseph George in the banner of Thekkadiyil Films, who also distributes the film through Play House Release.

Plot
Note Out tells the story of a group of youngsters led by Nishan who lead a care-free life with neither much aspirations nor any definite goals. A smart young girl (Mithra Kurian) happened to come across their life  which leads to so many unexpected incidents.

Cast
Nishan as Pavithran
Mithra Kurian as Maya
Jagathy Sreekumar as S. I. Eerally
Suraj Venjaramood as Vasu
Bijukuttan as Annachi/Aneesh
 Subbalakshmi
Anoop Chandran
Sumesh
Shiya
Alikkoya
K. T. C. Abdulla
Raghavan Purakkadu
Joseph George
Shibinas
Lijoy as Pavithran's Father
Roslin

References

External links
 Official site
 http://www.mallumovies.org/movie/not-out

2011 films
2010s Malayalam-language films
2011 comedy-drama films
Indian comedy-drama films